In mathematics, the orthogonal group in dimension , denoted , is the group of distance-preserving transformations of a Euclidean space of dimension  that preserve a fixed point, where the group operation is given by composing transformations. The orthogonal group is sometimes called the general orthogonal group, by analogy with the general linear group. Equivalently, it is the group of  orthogonal matrices, where the group operation is given by matrix multiplication (an orthogonal matrix is a real matrix whose inverse equals its transpose). The orthogonal group is an algebraic group and a Lie group. It is compact.

The orthogonal group in dimension  has two connected components. The one that contains the identity element is a normal subgroup, called the special orthogonal group, and denoted . It consists of all orthogonal matrices of determinant 1. This group is also called the rotation group, generalizing the fact that in dimensions 2 and 3, its elements are the usual rotations around a point (in dimension 2) or a line (in dimension 3). The other component consists of all orthogonal matrices of determinant . This component does not form a group, as the product of any two of its elements is of determinant 1, and therefore not an element of the component.

The  orthogonal
matrices form a subgroup, denoted , of the general linear group ; that is 

More generally, given a non-degenerate symmetric bilinear form or quadratic form on a vector space over a field, the orthogonal group of the form is the group of invertible linear maps that preserve the form. The preceding orthogonal groups are the special case where, on some basis, the bilinear form is the dot product, or, equivalently, the quadratic form is the sum of the square of the coordinates.

All orthogonal groups are algebraic groups, since the condition of preserving a form can be expressed as an equality of matrices.

Name

The name of "orthogonal group" originates from the following characterization of its elements.

In Euclidean geometry

The orthogonal group  is the subgroup of the general linear group , consisting of all endomorphisms that preserve the Euclidean norm; that is, endomorphisms  such that 

Let  be the group of the Euclidean isometries of a Euclidean space  of dimension . This group does not depend on the choice of a particular space, since all Euclidean spaces of the same dimension are isomorphic. The stabilizer subgroup of a point  is the subgroup of the elements  such that . This stabilizer is (or, more exactly, is isomorphic to) , since the choice of a point as an origin induces an isomorphism between the Euclidean space and its associated Euclidean vector space.

where, as usual, the subtraction of two points denotes the translation vector that maps the second point to the first one.

Special orthogonal group
By choosing an orthonormal basis of a Euclidean vector space, the orthogonal group can be identified with the group (under matrix multiplication) of orthogonal matrices, which are the matrices such that 

Its finite subgroups are the cyclic group  of -fold rotations, for every positive integer .

Canonical form
For any element of  there is an orthogonal basis, where its matrix has the form

where the matrices  are 2-by-2 rotation matrices, that is matrices of the form 

with 

This results from the spectral theorem by regrouping eigenvalues that are complex conjugate, and taking into account that the absolute values of the eigenvalues of an orthogonal matrix are all equal to 1.

Reflections
Reflections are the elements of  whose canonical form is 

where  is the  identity matrix, and the zeros denote row or column zero matrices. In other words, a reflection is a transformation that transforms the space in its mirror image with respect to a hyperplane.

In dimension two, every rotation is the product of two reflections.

This results immediately from the above canonical form and the case of dimension two.

The Cartan–Dieudonné theorem is the generalization of this result to the orthogonal group of a nondegenerate quadratic form over a field of characteristic different from two.

The reflection through the origin (the map ) is an example of an element of  that is not the product of fewer than  reflections.

Symmetry group of spheres

This isomorphism sends the complex number  of absolute value  to the special orthogonal matrix

In higher dimension,  has a more complicated structure (in particular, it is no longer commutative).

Group structure
The group  has two connected components, with  being the identity component, that is, the connected component containing the identity matrix.

As algebraic groups
The orthogonal group  can be identified with the group of the matrices  such that   
Since both members of this equation are symmetric matrices, this provides  equations that the entries of an orthogonal matrix must satisfy, and which are not all satisfied by the entries of any non-orthogonal matrix.

This proves that  is an algebraic set. Moreover, it can be proved that its dimension is
 
which implies that  is a complete intersection. This implies that all its irreducible components have the same dimension, and that it has no embedded component.
Both are nonsingular algebraic varieties of the same dimension .

Maximal tori and Weyl groups

The elements of the Weyl group are represented by matrices in }.
The  factor is represented by block permutation matrices with 2-by-2 blocks, and a final 1 on the diagonal. The  component is represented by block-diagonal matrices with 2-by-2 blocks either

with the last component  chosen to make the determinant 1.

Topology

Low-dimensional topology
The low-dimensional (real) orthogonal groups are familiar spaces:
 , a two-point discrete space
 
  is 
  is  

Fundamental group
For  the fundamental group is infinite cyclic and the universal cover corresponds to the  real line (the group  is the unique connected 2-fold cover).

Homotopy groups
Generally, the homotopy groups  of the real orthogonal group are related to homotopy groups of spheres, and thus are in general hard to compute. However, one can compute the homotopy groups of the stable orthogonal group (aka the infinite orthogonal group), defined as the direct limit of the sequence of inclusions:

Since the inclusions are all closed, hence cofibrations, this can also be interpreted as a union.
 

which can be understood as "The orthogonal group  acts transitively on the unit sphere , and the stabilizer of a point (thought of as a unit vector) is the orthogonal group of the perpendicular complement, which is an orthogonal group one dimension lower."

Relation to KO-theory
Via the clutching construction, homotopy groups of the stable space  are identified with stable vector bundles on spheres (up to isomorphism), with a dimension shift of 1: . Setting  (to make  fit into the periodicity), one obtains:

Computation and interpretation of homotopy groups

Low-dimensional groups
The first few homotopy groups can be calculated by using the concrete descriptions of low-dimensional groups.

, which surjects onto ; this latter thus vanishes.

Lie groups

Vector bundles
Thus over each point, the bundle is trivial, and the non-triviality of the bundle is the difference between the dimensions of the vector spaces over the two points, so  is dimension.

Loop spaces
Using π0,  and  have two components,  and  have countably many components, and the rest are connected.

Interpretation of homotopy groups
In a nutshell:

 is about dimension
 is about orientation
 is about spin
 is about topological quantum field theory.

 is generated by 
 is generated by 
 is generated by 
 is generated by 

Whitehead tower
The orthogonal group anchors a Whitehead tower:

which is obtained by successively removing (killing) homotopy groups of increasing order. This is done by constructing short exact sequences starting with an Eilenberg–MacLane space for the homotopy group to be removed. The first few entries in the tower are the spin group and the string group, and are preceded by the fivebrane group.  The homotopy groups that are killed are in turn 0(O) to obtain SO from O, 1(O) to obtain Spin from SO, 3(O) to obtain String from Spin, and then 7(O) and so on to obtain the higher order branes.

Of indefinite quadratic form over the reals

The pair  called the inertia, is an invariant of the quadratic form, in the sense that it does not depend on the way of computing the diagonal matrix.

The orthogonal group of a quadratic form depends only on the inertia, and is thus generally denoted . Moreover, as a quadratic form and its opposite have the same orthogonal group, one has .

So, in the remainder of this section, it is supposed that neither  nor  is zero.

The group  has four connected components, depending on whether an element preserves  orientation on either of the two maximal subspaces where the quadratic form is positive definite or negative definite. The component of the identity, whose elements preserve orientation on both subspaces, is denoted .

The group  is the Lorentz group that is fundamental in relativity theory. Here the  corresponds to space coordinates, and  corresponds to the time coordinate.

Of complex quadratic forms
Thus, up to isomorphism, there is only one non-degenerate complex quadratic space of dimension , and one associated orthogonal group, usually denoted . It is the group of complex orthogonal matrices, complex matrices whose product with their transpose is the identity matrix.

As in the real case,  has two connected components.

For , these groups are noncompact.

Over finite fields

Characteristic different from two
Over a field of characteristic different from two, two quadratic forms are equivalent if their matrices are congruent, that is if a change of basis transforms the matrix of the first form into the matrix of the second form. Two equivalent quadratic forms have clearly the same orthogonal group.

The non-degenerate quadratic forms over a finite field of characteristic different from two are completely classified   into congruence classes, and it results from this classification that there is only one orthogonal group in odd dimension and two in even dimension.

More precisely, Witt's decomposition theorem asserts that (in characteristic different from two) every vector space equipped with a non-degenerate quadratic form  can be decomposed as a direct sum of pairwise orthogonal subspaces
 

It results that there is only one orthogonal group that is denoted , where  is the number of elements of the finite field (a power of an odd prime).

The orthogonal group  is a dihedral group of order , where .

When the characteristic is not two, the order of the orthogonal groups are
 
 
 
In characteristic two, the formulas are the same, except that the factor  of  must be removed.

The Dickson invariant
For orthogonal groups, the Dickson invariant is a homomorphism from the orthogonal group to the quotient group  (integers modulo 2), taking the value  in case the element is the product of an even number of reflections, and the value of 1 otherwise.

Over fields that are not of characteristic 2 it is equivalent to the determinant: the determinant is −1 to the power of the Dickson invariant.
Over fields of characteristic 2, the determinant is always 1, so the Dickson invariant gives more information than the determinant.

Each element in  has determinant . Thus in characteristic 2, the determinant is always .

The Dickson invariant can also be defined for Clifford groups and pin groups in a similar way (in all dimensions).

Orthogonal groups of characteristic 2
Over fields of characteristic 2 orthogonal groups often exhibit special behaviors, some of which are listed in this section. (Formerly these groups were known as the hypoabelian groups, but this term is no longer used.)

Any orthogonal group over any field is generated by reflections, except for a unique example where the vector space is 4-dimensional over the field with 2 elements and the Witt index is 2. A reflection in characteristic two has a slightly different definition.
The center of the orthogonal group usually has order 1 in characteristic 2, rather than 2, since .
In odd dimensions  in characteristic 2, orthogonal groups over perfect fields are the same as symplectic groups in dimension . In fact the symmetric form is alternating in characteristic 2, and as the dimension is odd it must have a kernel of dimension 1, and the quotient by this kernel is a symplectic space of dimension , acted upon by the orthogonal group.
In even dimensions in characteristic 2 the orthogonal group is a subgroup of the symplectic group, because the symmetric bilinear form of the quadratic form is also an alternating form.

The spinor norm

For the usual orthogonal group over the reals, it is trivial, but it is often non-trivial over other fields, or for the orthogonal group of a quadratic form over the reals that is not positive definite.

Galois cohomology and orthogonal groups
In the theory of Galois cohomology of algebraic groups, some further points of view are introduced. They have explanatory value, in particular in relation with the theory of quadratic forms; but were for the most part post hoc, as far as the discovery of the phenomena is concerned. The first point is that quadratic forms over a field can be identified as a Galois , or twisted forms (torsors) of an orthogonal group. As an algebraic group, an orthogonal group is in general neither connected nor simply-connected; the latter point brings in the spin phenomena, while the former is related to the determinant.

The 'spin' name of the spinor norm can be explained by a connection to the spin group (more accurately a pin group). This may now be explained quickly by Galois cohomology (which however postdates the introduction of the term by more direct use of Clifford algebras). The spin covering of the orthogonal group provides a short exact sequence of algebraic groups.

Here  is the algebraic group of square roots of 1; over a field of characteristic not 2 it is roughly the same as a two-element group with trivial Galois action.

The cohomology is non-abelian so that this is as far as we can go, at least with the conventional definitions.

Lie algebra

The Lie algebra corresponding to Lie groups  and  consists of the skew-symmetric  matrices, with the Lie bracket  given by the commutator. One Lie algebra corresponds to both groups. Over real numbers, these Lie algebras for different  are the compact real forms of two of the four families of semisimple Lie algebras: in odd dimension , where , while in even dimension , where .

Since the group  is not simply connected, the representation theory of the orthogonal Lie algebras includes both representations corresponding to ordinary representations of the orthogonal groups, and representations corresponding to projective representations of the orthogonal groups. The latter are the so-called spin representation, which are important in physics.

More generally, given a vector space  (over a field with characteristic not equal to 2) with a nondegenerate symmetric bilinear form , the special orthogonal Lie algebra consists of tracefree endomorphisms  which are skew-symmetric for this form. Over a field of characteristic 2 we consider instead the alternating endomorphisms. Concretely we can equate these with the alternating tensors . The correspondence is given by:

This description applies equally for the indefinite special orthogonal Lie algebras  for symmetric bilinear forms with signature .

Over real numbers, this characterization is used in interpreting the curl of a vector field (naturally a 2-vector) as an infinitesimal rotation or "curl", hence the name.

Related groups
The orthogonal groups and special orthogonal groups have a number of important subgroups, supergroups, quotient groups, and covering groups. These are listed below.

Lie subgroups
In physics, particularly in the areas of Kaluza–Klein compactification, it is important to find out the subgroups of the orthogonal group. The main ones are:

 – preserve an axis
 –  are those that preserve a compatible complex structure or a compatible symplectic structure – see 2-out-of-3 property;  also preserves a complex orientation.

Lie supergroups
The orthogonal group  is also an important subgroup of various Lie groups:

Conformal group

Being isometries, real orthogonal transforms preserve angles, and are thus conformal maps, though not all conformal linear transforms are orthogonal. In classical terms this is the difference between congruence and similarity, as exemplified by SSS (side-side-side) congruence of triangles and AAA (angle-angle-angle) similarity of triangles.

Similarly one can define ; note that this is always: .

Discrete subgroups
As the orthogonal group is compact, discrete subgroups are equivalent to finite subgroups. These subgroups are known as point groups and can be realized as the symmetry groups of polytopes. A very important class of examples are the finite Coxeter groups, which include the symmetry groups of regular polytopes.

Dimension 3 is particularly studied – see point groups in three dimensions, polyhedral groups, and list of spherical symmetry groups. In 2 dimensions, the finite groups are either cyclic or dihedral – see point groups in two dimensions.

Other finite subgroups include:
 Permutation matrices (the Coxeter group )
 Signed permutation matrices (the Coxeter group ); also equals the intersection of the orthogonal group with the integer matrices.

Covering and quotient groups
The orthogonal group is neither simply connected nor centerless, and thus has both a covering group and a quotient group, respectively:
 The quotient projective orthogonal group, .
These are all 2-to-1 covers.

For the special orthogonal group, the corresponding groups are:
 Spin group,
 Projective special orthogonal group, .

In dimension 3 and above these are the covers and quotients, while dimension 2 and below are somewhat degenerate; see specific articles for details.

Principal homogeneous space: Stiefel manifold

The principal homogeneous space for the orthogonal group  is the Stiefel manifold  of orthonormal bases (orthonormal -frames).

In other words, the space of orthonormal bases is like the orthogonal group, but without a choice of base point: given an orthogonal space, there is no natural choice of orthonormal basis, but once one is given one, there is a one-to-one correspondence between bases and the orthogonal group. Concretely, a linear map is determined by where it sends a basis: just as an invertible map can take any basis to any other basis, an orthogonal map can take any orthogonal basis to any other orthogonal basis.

See also

Specific transforms
Coordinate rotations and reflections
Reflection through the origin

Specific groups
rotation group, SO(3, R)
SO(8)

Related groups
indefinite orthogonal group
unitary group
symplectic group

Lists of groups
list of finite simple groups
list of simple Lie groups

Representation theory

 Representations of classical Lie groups
 Brauer algebra

Notes

Citations

References

External links

John Baez "This Week's Finds in Mathematical Physics" week 105
John Baez on Octonions
  n-dimensional Special Orthogonal Group parametrization

Lie groups
Quadratic forms
Euclidean symmetries
Linear algebraic groups